Revenge Is Mine (German: Die Rache ist mein) is a 1919 German silent film directed by Alwin Neuß and starring Paul Otto and Lil Dagover.

Cast
 Paul Otto
 Alwin Neuß
 Arnold Czempin
 Helga Molander
 Lil Dagover
 Hanni Reinwald

References

Bibliography
 Hardt, Ursula. From Caligari to California: Erich Pommer's Life in the International Film Wars. Berghahn Books, 1996.
 McGilligan, Patrick. Fritz Lang: The Nature of the Beast. University of Minnesota Press, 2013.

External links

1919 films
Films of the Weimar Republic
German silent feature films
Films directed by Alwin Neuß
German black-and-white films
1910s German films